Figa may refer to:
 Figa, Bistrița-Năsăud, a village and spa in Beclean, Romania
 Figa, Slovakia, a village and municipality in Banská Bystrica Region of southern Slovakia
 Fig sign or figa, a hand gesture
 FIGLA or transcription factor FIGa, a protein that in humans is encoded by the FIGLA gene
 Figa, an Italian profanity
 Phillip S. Figa (1951–2008), U.S. District Judge

See also
 A Figa, an archaeological site in Corsica
 Figa la Sarra, an archaeological site in Corsica
 FIGAS or Falkland Islands Government Air Service
 Figo (disambiguation)
 Alessandro Figà Talamanca, an Italian mathematician